Harold Alexander Irving (March 4, 1927 – May 22, 2006) was a Canadian football player who played for the Calgary Stampeders and Edmonton Eskimos. He won the Grey Cup with the Stampeders in 1948. Irving previously attended and played football for the University of Alberta Golden Bears and hockey for the McGill University Redmen. He died of Alzheimer's disease in 2006.

Harry Irving played junior football with future Premier Peter Lougheed with the Calgary Tornadoes.

References

1927 births
2006 deaths
Calgary Stampeders players
Edmonton Elks players
Canadian football people from Calgary